The Ambassador of Australia for Asia-Pacific Economic Cooperation is an officer of the Australian Department of Foreign Affairs and Trade and the head of the delegation of the Commonwealth of Australia to the Asia-Pacific Economic Cooperation (APEC), based with its secretariat in Singapore. The position has the rank and status of an Ambassador Extraordinary and Plenipotentiary and has been sent since March 1996, when Deputy Prime Minister and Minister for Trade Tim Fischer appointed Peter Grey as the first Ambassador, although APEC has existed since 1989.

List of Ambassadors

References

External links
Asia-Pacific Economic Cooperation (APEC), DFAT

Ambassadors of Australia for Asia-Pacific Economic Cooperation
Asia-Pacific Economic Cooperation
Asia-Pacific Economic Cooperation